Chaetogastra anderssonii, synonym Tibouchina anderssonii, is a species of plant in the family Melastomataceae. It is endemic to Ecuador.

References

anderssonii
Endemic flora of Ecuador
Endangered plants
Taxonomy articles created by Polbot